The 1988 24 Hours of Le Mans was the 56th Grand Prix of Endurance, and took place on 11 and 12 June 1988.  It was also the fifth round of the World Sports-Prototype Championship season.

Race
The Porsches were able to turn up the turbo boost in qualifying, thus were able to qualify in the top spots. Early in the race Jaguar proved to be faster and overtook all the Porsches (In the normal race configuration turbo boost) by the 2nd lap.

After four years of trying with previous evolutions, Jaguar took the XJR-9 to victory against Porsche's works 962C in 1988. Apart from a lone Jaguar in fourth, Porsches filled the rest of the top ten.  The Sauber-Mercedes team withdrew prior to the event following concerns over blowouts from their Michelin tyres. The race covered a distance of 5,332.97 km, the most distance covered in any of the Le Mans 24 hours races, except 1971 when the Martini Racing Team Porsche 917K covered 5,335.313 km in 397 laps. Those records would however be broken over 20 years later in the 2010 24 Hours of Le Mans, when the #9 Audi R15 TDI plus of Joest Racing (under the name Audi Sport North America) tied the record for the number of laps around the Le Mans circuit (at 397 laps) and, due to its changing course configurations (such as the Mulsanne Straight chicanes), set an outright distance record of —roughly the distance between Miami and Seattle—over the 13.629-km course configuration.

This was the second-to-last 24-hour race without chicanes on the Mulsanne Straight, and Team WM Peugeot had prioritised breaking the speed record that year. Following the record setting run, the issues that had plagued the car all weekend (turbocharger, cooling and electrical) finally ended their race.

The Jaguar team suffered from gearbox problems, Lammers holding the car in 4th gear to prevent the gearbox from damaging itself.  The Bell, Stuck, Ludwig Porsche 962C came very close to winning, with Ludwig making a rare error by running out of fuel on the track and losing valuable time getting back to the pits. The win ended Porsche's 7-year reign at Le Mans. At least 50,000 British spectators were in attendance. At the end of the race the crowd flooded the track and drivers had trouble reaching the finish line. There were 280,000 spectators in attendance. The race was held from 15:00 to 15:00 because of French elections. The winning chassis had failed to finish at the previous four rounds.

Qualifying
Class leaders are in bold

Official results
Class winners in bold.  Cars failing to complete 70% of the winner's distance marked as Not Classified (NC).

Statistics
 Pole Position – Hans-Joachim Stuck, #17 Porsche AG – 3:15.64 (154.758 mph/249.058 km/h)
 Fastest Lap – Hans-Joachim Stuck, #17 Porsche AG – 3:22.50
 Distance – 5332.97 km
 Average Speed – 221.765 km/h
 Highest Trap Speed - #51 WM P87 Secateva - 253 mph (407 km/h) (qualifying) (all-time record)

Notes

References

 
 

24 Hours of Le Mans races
Le Mans
Le Mans
24 Hours of Le Mans